The Action démocratique du Québec (ADQ) party ran a full slate of 125 candidates in the 2003 Quebec provincial election and elected four members to emerge as the third-largest party in the National Assembly.

Candidates (incomplete)

References

2003